The North West Men's League is a rugby league competition for clubs in the North West of England. It is a successor league for the Rugby League Conference also comprising clubs from the North West Counties League following most of the latter switching to summer to follow the National Conference League.

History

The North West Men's League comes from the merger of elements from two strands of rugby league: the British Amateur Rugby League Association and Rugby League Conference.

The British Amateur Rugby League Association (BARLA) was created in 1973 by a group of enthusiasts concerned about the dramatic disappearance of many amateur leagues and clubs. BARLA merged the Leigh, Manchester, St Helens, Warrington, Widnes and Wigan districts into a new North West Counties league and created an elite National Conference League, this saw a revitalisation of the game in heartland areas of the North West of England.

In contrast, the Rugby League Conference (RLC) was born in 1997 as the Southern Conference, a 10-team pilot league for teams in the South of England and English Midlands taking place in the summer time rather than the traditional winter season. It led to the creation of many new teams in non-traditional areas; the first North West team to join the new league were the Chester Wolves; more teams from the North West joined the following season and a Northern Division was set up with teams from the North West and the North Midlands. Following a big expansion to the Rugby League Conference in 2003, the North West got its own regional division.

By 2008, there were enough sides for a higher level North West Premier division to be created and in 2010, a North West Merit League was created out of existing merit leagues.

With the RLC growing rapidly, some BARLA sides chose to leave traditional winter leagues and join the summer-based RLC. However, in 2011, the National Conference League, voted to switch to a summer season and most of the reserve teams followed. There was a short season from September to November in 2011 with teams from British Amateur Rugby League Association league North West Counties league playing in two divisions under the name North West Men's League.

The Rugby League Conference was replaced in 2012 by a series of locally administered leagues. This saw the North West Men's League merge with the RLC North West Premier and regional divisions as well as the North West merit league to create a six division structure.

2015 Divisions

Premier Division
Hindley
Clock Face Miners
Widnes St Maries Vikings
Ashton Bears
Shevington Sharks
Haydock Warriors 
Haresfinch
Rylands Sharks
Widnes West Bank
Folly Lane
Heysham Atoms

Division 1
Wigan St Cuthbert's (failed to complete the season but results stood)
Halton Simms Cross
Thatto Heath Crusaders A
Wigan Spring View
Chorley Panthers
Wigan St Jude's A (failed to complete the season)
Hindpool Tigers
Bamber Bridge
St Helens Wildboars (failed to complete the season)
Latchford Albion
Wigan St Patrick's A

Division 2
Halton Farnworth Hornets
Leigh Miners Rangers A
Accrington Panthers (failed to complete the season)
Bank Quay Bulls
Woolston Rovers A
Oldham St Anne's A (failed to complete the season)
Rochdale Mayfield A
Golborne Parkside
Leyland Warriors
Widnes Tigers
Orrell St James
Bury Broncos

Division 3
Leigh East A
Pilkington Recs A
Burtonwood Bridge
Wigan Bulldogs
Fitton Hill Bulldogs 
Little Hulton Reds
Bolton Mets
Crosfields A
Blackpool Scorpions
Eccleston Lions

Division 4
Westhoughton Lions
Widnes West Bank A (failed to complete the season)
Culcheth Eagles
Chester Gladiators
Rylands Sharks A
Rochdale Cobras
Widnes St Maries Vikings A (failed to complete the season)
Manchester Rangers
Cadishead Rhinos
Garswood Stags
Runcorn
Bury Broncos A

Merit League
Burtonwood Bridge A (failed to complete the season)
Chester Gladiators A
Haresfinch A
Orrell St James A
Salford City Roosters A
Littleborough
Langworthy Reds
Mancunians
Burnley & Pendle
Liverpool Lions

Entrance Division
Southport Storm
Wigan Bulldogs A
Bury Broncos B
Heysham Atoms A
Latchford Albion A
Blackbrook A
Folly Lane A
Manchester Rangers A
North West Tigers
Bank Quay Bulls A
Rochdale Cobras A
Bamber Bridge A
Manchester Canalsiders
NB: Other teams in higher divisions can enter as well

2014 Divisions

Premier Division
Bank Quay Bulls
Clock Face Miners
Halton Simms Cross
Widnes St Maries Vikings
Ashton Bears
Shevington Sharks
Haydock Warriors
Halton Farnworth Hornets (failed to complete the season)
Haresfinch
Widnes West Bank
Folly Lane
Ulverston

Division 1
Thatto Heath Crusaders A
Leigh East A
Bold Miners
Wigan Spring View
Chorley Panthers
Wigan St Jude's A
Heysham Atoms
Hindpool Tigers
Bamber Bridge
St Helens Wildboars
Saddleworth Rangers A (failed to complete the season, results stood)
Irlam Hornets (failed to complete the season, results stood)

Division 2
Latchford Albion
Leigh Miners Rangers A
Wigan St Patrick's A 
Accrington Panthers
Culcheth Eagles
Portico Vine
Woolston Rovers A
Oldham St Anne's A
Rochdale Mayfield A
Widnes West Bank A (failed to complete the season, results stood)
Blackbrook A (failed to complete the season, results stood)
Rylands Sharks

Division 3
Pilkington Recs A
Burtonwood Bridge
Westhoughton Lions
Wigan Bulldogs
Ashton Bears A
Fitton Hill & Hathershaw Bulldogs 
Bury Broncos
Little Hulton Reds
Bolton Mets
Widnes Tigers
Orrell St James
Langworthy Reds

Division 4
Chester Gladiators
Crosfields A
Mancunians(failed to complete the season, results stood)
New Springs Legion Lions (failed to complete the season, results expunged)
Blackpool Scorpions
Rylands Sharks A
Rochdale Cobras
Widnes St Maries Vikings A 
East Manchester Rangers
Leyland Warriors
Cadishead Rhinos
Eccleston Lions

Entrance Division
Ashton Bears B
Bamber Bridge A
Bank Quay Bulls A
Blackpool Sea Eagles
Bolton Mets A
Burnley & Pendle
Burtonwood Bridge A
Bury Broncos A
Cadishead Rhinos A
Chester Gladiators A
Clock Face Miners A
Eccles A
Folly Lane A
Garswood Stags
Haresfinch A
Heysham Atoms A
Higginshaw
Lancashire Police
Liverpool Lions
Manchester Canalsiders
Mancunians A
Rochdale Cobras A
Runcorn
Wigan St Cuthberts A
Woolston Rovers B

entered other divisions and entry league:
Culcheth Eagles
Dee Valley Dragons
New Springs Lions
Wigan Bulldogs

entered but did not play:

Hindley A
Ince Rose Bridge A
Latchford Albion A
Waterhead A

2013 Divisions

Premier Division
Bank Quay Bulls
Clock Face Miners
Halton Simms Cross
Widnes St Maries Vikings
Ashton Bears
Shevington Sharks
Roose Pioneers (failed to complete the season)
Haydock Warriors
Halton Farnworth Hornets
Haresfinch

Division 1
Folly Lane
Rochdale Cobras (dropped down to division 5 part way through season)
Thatto Heath Crusaders A
Leigh East A
Wigan St Patrick's A (dropped down to division 2 part way through season)
Bold Miners
Wigan Spring View
Latchford Albion
Leyland Warriors (failed to complete the season, results stood)
Leigh Miners Rangers A
Chorley Panthers
Wigan St Jude's A
Heysham Atoms
Ulverston

Division 2
Wigan St Patrick's A (dropped down from division 1 part way through season)
Hindpool Tigers
Cadishead Rhinos (failed to complete the season, results stood)
Bamber Bridge
St Helens Wildboars
Newton Storm (dropped down to division 5 part way through the season)
Pilkington Recs A
Eccleston Lions (failed to complete the season, results stood)
Accrington Panthers
Culcheth Eagles
Portico Vine
Woolston Rovers A
Hilton Park (failed to complete the season, results expunged)

Division 3
Oldham St Anne's A
Rochdale Mayfield A
Ince Rose Bridge A (failed to complete the season, results stood)
Widnes West Bank A
Blackbrook A 
Waterhead A (failed to complete the season, results stood)
Wigan St Cuthbert's A (failed to complete the season, results stood)
Burtonwood Bridge
Saddleworth Rangers A
Crosfields A

Division 4
Chester Gladiators
Wigan Bulldogs
Ashton Bears A
Fitton Hill & Hathershaw Bulldogs 
Hindley A (failed to complete the season, results stood)
Bury Broncos
Little Hulton Reds
Bolton Mets
Westhoughton Lions
Mancunians
Latchford Albion A (failed to complete the season, results stood)
Widnes Tigers
Orrell St James
New Springs Legion Lions (failed to complete the season, results stood)

Division 5
Blackpool Scorpions
Liverpool Lions (failed to complete the season, results stood)
Bury Broncos A
Rylands Sharks
Rochdale Cobras (dropped down from division 1)
Widnes St Maries Vikings A (failed to complete the season, results stood)
Newton Storm (dropped down from division 2, failed to complete the season, results expunged)
Bank Quay Bulls A (failed to complete the season, results expunged)
Hope Valley Hawks (failed to start the season)
Orrell St James A (failed to start the season)
Leigh Miners Rangers A (failed to start the season)
Eccles A (failed to start the season)

Entrance Division
All division 5 clubs plus:
Burnley & Pendle
Blackpool Sea Eagles
East Manchester Rangers
West Craven Warriors
Leyland Warriors (after dropping out of division 1)
Cadishead Rangers (after dropping out of division 2)
Eccleston Lions (after dropping out of division 2)
Newton Storm (after dropping out of division 5)
Eccles A (after dropping out of division 5)
Hope Valley Hawks (after dropping out of division 5)
Rylands Sharks A

2012 Divisions

Premier Division
Bank Quay Bulls
Pilkington Recs
Blackbrook 
Clock Face Miners (failed to complete the season, results stood)
Halton Simms Cross
Widnes St Maries Vikings
Wigan St Cuthberts
Ashton Bears
Barrow Island
NB: Golborne Parkside withdrew midseason

Division 1
Folly Lane
Shevington Sharks
Roose Pioneers
Haydock Warriors
Rochdale Cobras
Walney Central
Hindley
Thatto Heath Crusaders A
Leigh East A
Wigan St Patrick's A
Woolston Rovers
NB: Rylands Sharks withdrew midseason

Division 2
Oldham St Anne's A
Bold Miners
Wigan Spring View
Halton Farnworth Hornets
Haresfinch
Latchford Albion
Leyland Warriors
Leigh Miners Rangers A
Rochdale Mayfield A
Chorley Panthers
Wigan St Jude's A
Ince Rose Bridge A

Division 3
Warrington Wizards A (midseason replacements for Widnes St Maries A; also failed to complete the season but results stood)
Heysham Atoms
Ulverston
Hindpool Tigers
Cadishead Rhinos
Bamber Bridge
Bank Quay Bulls A
Widnes West Bank A
St Helens Wildboars
Blackbrook A (failed to complete the season but results stood)
NB: Higginshaw withdrew midseason.

Division 4
Waterhead A (failed to complete the season but results stood)
Newton Storm
Pilkington Recs A
Eccleston Lions
Wigan St Cuthbert's A
Burtonwood Bridge
Accrington Panthers
Folly Lane A (failed to complete the season but results stood)
Wigan Riversiders
Eccles & Salford Roosters A
Saddleworth Rangers A

Division 5
Chester Gladiators
Wigan Bulldogs
Woolston Rovers A
Ashton Bears A
Fitton Hill & Hathershaw Bulldogs (failed to complete the season but results stood)
Hindley A
Bury Broncos
Culcheth Eagles
Little Hulton Reds
Crosfields A
Portico Vine
Bolton Mets

Entrance Division
Blackpool Stanley
Blackpool Scorpions
Burnley & Pendle
Crosby St Mary's
Heysham Atoms
Liverpool City
Bury Broncos A
Westhoughton Lions
Mancunians
Manor Park
Rochdale Cobras A
Latchford Albion A
Burtonwood Bridge A
Chorley Panthers A
Warrington Wizards A (called up to division 3 midseason)
Wigan Riversiders
NB: Heysham Atoms, Wigan Riversiders and Warrington Wizards A also played in higher divisions.

2011 structure

Division 1
Latchford Albion 
Thatto Heath Crusaders A
Leyland Warriors 
Bank Quay Bulls
Cadishead Rhinos 
Bamber Bridge
Wigan St Patricks A
Folly Lane
Adlington Rangers 
Leigh East A
Hindley

Division 2
Burtonwood Bridge
Bank Quay Bulls A 
Little Hulton Reds
Chorley Panthers 
Accrington Panthers
Chester Gladiators 
Bury Broncos
Wigan Riversiders 
Folly Lane A
Bolton Mets 
Newton Storm
Hindley A 
Widnes West Bank A
Culcheth Eagles

NB:

9 National Conference League clubs will reserve their reserve teams in a separate reserve league in the interim season: Leigh Miners Rangers, Wigan St Judes, Ince Rose Bridge, Crosfields, Eccles & Salford Roosters, Rochdale Mayfield, Oldham St Anne's, Waterhead and Saddleworth Rangers

Past winners

Premier Division

2012 Pilkington Recs
2013 Haltons Simms Cross 26-19 Widnes St Maries
2014 Widnes West Bank
2015 Widnes West Bank
2016 Haydock
2017 Thatto Heath Crusaders A
2018 West Bank Bears

Division 1

2011
2012

Division 2

2011
2012 Halton Farnworth Hornets

Division 3

2012

Division 4

2012

Division 5

2012

Entrance Division

See also
 British rugby league system
 Rugby League Conference
 North West Counties
 North West Merit League

External links
Official website

Rugby league competitions in the United Kingdom
Sports leagues established in 2011
2011 establishments in England